Dasht-e Rum Rural District is a rural district (dehestan) in the Central District of Boyer-Ahmad County, Kohgiluyeh and Boyer-Ahmad Province, Iran. At the 2006 census, its population was 9,874, in 2,006 families. The rural district has 55 villages.

References 

Rural Districts of Kohgiluyeh and Boyer-Ahmad Province
Boyer-Ahmad County